Tammany Tiger may refer to:

 Tammany Hall, a defunct political organization which was frequently depicted by editorial cartoonists as a tiger
 The Winnipeg Tammany Tigers, a Canadian football team which played in the 13th Grey Cup